RVM may refer to:

Companies and organizations 
 Reich Ministry of Transport, German government agency (1919–1945)
 Religious of the Virgin Mary, an ecclesiastical community of Filipino Roman Catholic women 
 Rayo Vallecano de Madrid, a football club

Mathematics, science, medicine and technology 
 Red Velvet Mite, arachnids known for their bright red colors
 Rostral ventromedial medulla, a group of neurons in the medulla oblongata
 Real-valued measurable, an axiom asserting the existence of a real-valued measurable cardinal number
 Reference Verification Methodology, a method for functional verification of complex designs
 Relevance vector machine, a machine learning technique.
 Reverse vending machine, a sensor-based machine for sorting and recycling
 Ruby Version Manager, a software tool to manage Ruby programming language versions
 "RVM", abbreviation for the Jikes Research Virtual Machine
 .rvm - file extension associated with PDMS

Other uses 
 "RVM", station code for Richmond Main Street Station, Richmond, Virginia
 Royal Victorian Medal, Commonwealth military decoration post-nominal letters

See also 
 RVN (disambiguation)